Nechemiah Cohen (April 30, 1943 – June 5, 1967) is the most decorated soldier in the history of the Israel Defense Forces (IDF). He shares this honour with close friend and former Prime Minister Ehud Barak, and Major Amitai Hason. He received five decorations – one Medal of Distinguished Service and four Chief Of Staff Citations. Cohen was killed in combat near the City of Gaza on June 5, 1967, the first day of the Six-Day War, aged 24.

His older brother Eliezer Cohen served as a fighter pilot and was a member of the Knesset.

References

1943 births
1967 deaths
Israeli soldiers
Israeli military personnel killed in action
Israeli military casualties of the Six-Day War
Burials at Mount Herzl
Israeli people of Turkish-Jewish descent